Julio's Day is a graphic novel by Gilbert Hernandez, serialized in Love and Rockets Volume 2 in 2001–2007 and collected in 2013.  It tells the story of a man whose life spans the years 1900 to 2000.

Synopsis

The story traces the life of the title character Julio from his birth in 1900 to his death in 2000.  It takes place in a rural village in the American South.

Publication

The story's serialization appeared from 2001 to 2007 in Love and Rockets Volume 2 1–14 and 17–20.  Hernandez expanded the page count significantly for its collection in 2013, which included an introduction by Brian Evenson and a blurb from Junot Díaz.

References

Works cited

Further reading

 
 
 
 
 

2013 graphic novels
American graphic novels
Gilbert Hernandez
Fantagraphics titles